was a town located in Kanzaki District, Shiga Prefecture, Japan, at the western foot of Suzuka Mountains.

As of 2003, the town had an estimated population of 6,194 and a density of 34.17 persons per km². The total area was 181.27 km².

On February 11, 2005, Eigenji, along with the city of Yōkaichi, the town of Gokashō (also from Kanzaki District), and the towns of Aitō and Kotō (both from Echi District), was merged to create the city of Higashiōmi.

The town was named after a famous temple Eigen-ji and it is a key spot for viewing the momiji leaves turn red in the autumn. Mountain villages in east of the town is famous for rare green tea and had been a base of traditional woodworkers since 9th century.

External links 
Eigenji Tourist Information Guide 

Dissolved municipalities of Shiga Prefecture